Emerald Yeh (born 1956) was the mid-day anchor for the local news broadcast on KRON in the San Francisco Bay Area from 1984 to 2003, when KRON discontinued its local news programming.

Personal life and education
Yeh was born in Princeton, New Jersey to Zuei-Zong (sometimes romanized as Rui Zong) and Suchu Yeh, immigrants from Taiwan. Her father Zuei-Zong Yeh was pursuing his doctorate in mathematics from Princeton University. After her father completed his studies the family (including Emerald's younger brother, Elm) traveled to Hong Kong, Tokyo, and Macau before settling in Honolulu, Hawaii, where her father taught mathematics at the University of Hawaii. Yeh was raised in Hawaii. She is named for her birth stone.

Yeh graduated from Kaimuki High School and completed her undergraduate studies at the University of Hawaii with a major in journalism and a minor in political science, then earned a Master's degree in journalism from Columbia University.

Yeh married Ron Blatman in December 1993; the couple welcomed twin boys in April 1997. Larry Ching sang at Yeh's wedding.

Career
Yeh began her broadcast career as an intern for KITV (the ABC affiliate in Honolulu) in 1977, while still attending the University of Hawaii and working for the school newspaper; she ended up graduating a semester late and continued working at KITV for an additional six months before starting graduate school at Columbia in 1979. After she graduated in 1980, Yeh moved on to KPTV in Portland, Oregon for nearly three years. After KPTV, Yeh was the co-anchor for CNN Daybreak on CNN in 1983. When interviewing with CNN, she was asked why she couldn't style her hair like Connie Chung.

She moved to the Bay Area in 1984, joining KRON as the weekend co-anchor. While at KRON, Yeh gave up the 11 PM co-anchor spot to begin reporting on social issues and human interest stories in 1991; she was named the co-anchor of "Midday" and began working as the "Contact 4" consumer reporter in 1994. Nearly two decades and nine Emmy Awards later, Yeh was let go by KRON in 2003 to cut costs.

Yeh is a longtime philanthropist and advocate for Asian American issues, including serving as a founding board member for the Asian Pacific Fund.

Notes

References

External links
 

1956 births
20th-century American journalists
21st-century American journalists
American journalists of Chinese descent
American women journalists of Asian descent
American television news anchors
Living people
People from Princeton, New Jersey
20th-century American women
21st-century American women